Glenea pulchella is a species of beetle in the family Cerambycidae. It was described by Francis Polkinghorne Pascoe in 1858. It is known from Java, Malaysia, Sumatra, Borneo, Moluccas, and the Philippines.

Varietas
 Glenea pulchella var. postmediopunctata Breuning, 1956
 Glenea pulchella var. preapiceconjuncta Breuning, 1956
 Glenea pulchella var. transversevittata Breuning, 1956

References

pulchella
Beetles described in 1858